Makiling is an upland barangay in Calamba in the province of Laguna, Philippines. It is named after its location on the foot of Mount Makiling, the highest mountain in Laguna province.

School 
 Lyceum of the Philippines University-Laguna

Population
2020 - 12,508
2015 - 10,760 
2010 - 7,510
2007 - 7,100
2000 - 5,130
1995 - 4,326
1990 - 3,382
1980 - 2,000

References

External links
Official Website of the Government of Laguna

Barangays of Calamba, Laguna